Roccarainola is a comune (municipality) in the Metropolitan City of Naples in the Italian region Campania, located about 30 km northeast of Naples.

Sights include the medieval castle (rocca) from which it takes its name.

References

External links
 Official website

Cities and towns in Campania